Live in Detroit may refer to:
Live in Detroit (Roscoe Mitchell album), 1988
Live in Detroit (The Doors album), 2001
Live in Detroit (The Stooges album), 2003
Live in Detroit (EP), a 2003 EP by Thursday 
 Live in Detroit (Thor album), 1985
 Live in Detroit, MI, an album by King Crimson
Live in Detroit – 1984, an album by Black 'n Blue